The 1974 All England Championships was a badminton tournament held at Wembley Arena, London, England, from 20–23 March 1974.

Final results

Men's singles

Section 1

Section 2

Eva Twedberg remarried and played under the name Eva Stuart and Marieluise Wackerow married and became Marieluise Zizmann.

Women's singles

Section 1

Section 2

References

All England Open Badminton Championships
All England
All England Open Badminton Championships in London
All England Badminton Championships
All England Badminton Championships
All England Badminton Championships